Xing Xiuniang (1793–1858) was a Chinese farmer-turned-Chinese opera actress from Qing-dynasty Huangmei County, Hubei Province. In the early Daoguang period (1820–1850) she also lived and performed in Jiangxi Province. She was famous for her beauty and talent, but almost no written records on her life have survived because her fans were almost all illiterate farmers and laborers.

Anecdotes
In 1962, researcher Gui Yuqiu collected some anecdotes about Xing Xiuniang from local tea-picking opera artists Gui Youlin and Mei Chongxi, who in turn received the stories from their seniors Luo Yunbao, Mei Jinyu and Shuai Shixin. In 1982, a bamboo craftsmith named Gui Guangwen shared additional anecdotes he heard in the 1960s.

According to them, Xing Xiuniang was born in a peasant family in Dadun (大墩), Konglong, Huangmei County, Hubei. She learned tea-picking opera and lianxiang dance from her older brother and his wife. She got married, but her husband soon drowned while repairing a dam. She moved back to live with her brother's family, did farm work, and performed locally during the slow days. She played dan (female) roles, such as the Seventh Fairy and Zhu Yingtai, to great acclaim.

In the 1820s, her hometown was flooded and her brother died. Unable to survive, Xing Xiuniang, along with her sister-in-law, young nephew, and aging mother moved to northern Jiangxi Province. There she joined a local theatrical troupe (with her sister-in-law) and began performing in Duchang, Poyang, Fuliang, Jingdezhen, and other places near the Poyang Lake. She was beautiful and gifted and soon became a celebrity among the farmers and ceramic workers.

In Jingdezhen a street bully became interested in her; when Xing Xiuniang refused his advances he began to harass her. That was when Wu Rong, a martial artist from Sichuan Province who also performed on the streets in Jingdezhen decided to intervene. Wu challenged the bully to a one-on-one fight on the bank of the Chang River and demolished him. Later, knowing that the bully would not quit easily, he escorted Xing Xiuniang and her family back to Huangmei.

Another hurdle awaited her: her local leader had arranged for her to marry a rich squire as his concubine. Wu Rong came to the rescue again: he sat in the wedding chamber in her place and when the bridegroom came in, explained to him Xing's situation and offered to donate his savings so that he could choose another bride. The squire agreed to find another concubine, while Wu Rong and Xing Xiuniang, now lovers, eventually became a couple.

21st century
It was formerly assumed that Xing Xiuniang performed tea-picking opera and daoqiang. In the 21st century, however, there has been a push by the Huangmei County government to associate her with Huangmei opera (which, though named after the county, is believed by many to have originated in neighboring Anqing around the same time). 

A historical novel (by Zhou Zhuojie, a Huangmei native) that presents her as the first grandmaster of Huangmei opera has been made into a 2012 TV series starring Cao Xiwen as Xing. Filmed in Huangmei and partly funded by the Huangmei County government, The Legend of the Huangmei Opera Grandmaster has generated anger in Anqing.

Huangmei County has also allocated ￥1.1 billion towards a tourist site named "Xing Xiuniang Ecological Park".

References

Chinese farmers
People from Huangmei County
19th-century Chinese actresses
Singers from Hubei
Actresses from Hubei
1790s births
1858 deaths
Year of birth uncertain
19th-century Chinese women singers